Playground Tuhkimo (Leikkipuisto Tuhkimo in Finnish, Lekparken Askungen in Swedish) is a public, free of charge park at Roihuvuori district in Helsinki, Finland.

General 

The playground is located in a valley between two Metamorphic rocks. From the rocks of the area can clearly be seen the tracks of the ice age. In the 19th century the area  belonged to a tenant farmer called Kiilatorppa from Herttoniemi estate. A map from 1936 showed that this area was just a field.

The Park's name, Tuhkimo comes from the fairy tale Cinderella (Tuhkimo in Finnish). The park has been particularly popular with families. The playground is surrounded by Roihuvuori forests, but in the south it ends in Tuhkimontie (street).

Gallery

References 

Parks in Helsinki